Comparative Cytogenetics is a peer-reviewed open access scientific journal covering plant and animal cytogenetics, karyosystematics, and molecular systematics. It was established in 2007 by the Zoological Institute of the Russian Academy of Sciences. In 2009 it switched to  Pensoft Publishers. The editors-in-chief are Valentina G. Kuznetsova and Ilya A. Gavrilov-Zimin (Russian Academy of Science).

Abstracting and indexing 
The journal is abstracted and indexed in:
 Science Citation Index Expanded.
 Current Contents/Agriculture, Biology & Environmental Sciences.
 The Zoological Record.
 BIOSIS Previews.
According to the Journal Citation Reports, the journal has a 2013 impact factor of 1.211.

References

External links 

 

Systematics journals
Publications established in 2007
Creative Commons Attribution-licensed journals
Genetics journals
English-language journals
Pensoft Publishers academic journals
2007 establishments in Russia